Mikhail Kasyanov's Cabinet (May 2000 - March 2004) was a cabinet of the government of the Russian Federation during most of Vladimir Putin's first presidential term. It followed Vladimir Putin's Cabinet after Vladimir Putin became President of Russia and was replaced with Mikhail Fradkov's First Cabinet shortly before the presidential election of 2004. It was led by Prime Minister Mikhail Kasyanov, proposed by President Vladimir Putin after his inauguration on May 7 and approved by the State Duma and appointed Prime Minister by the President on May 17, 2000. Prior to this, Kasyanov was the Finance Minister in Vladimir Putin's Cabinet, and as Putin was promoted to acting President on December 31, 1999, de facto had led his cabinet since January 10, when he was appointed also First Deputy Prime Minister. Other 28 ministers were appointed by the President on May 18–20. Only six of them were new to the government: Gennady Bukaev, Alexander Dondukov, Alexander Gavrin, German Gref, Alexey Kudrin and Igor Shuvalov.

Further development
On November 28, 2000, the position of Minister for Coordination of the Development of the Chechen Republic was established and occupied by Vladimir Yelagin.

On February 5, 2001, Alexander Gavrin was dismissed as Minister of Energy.

On March 28, 2001, Igor Sergeyev was replaced with Sergei Ivanov as Defence Minister, Vladimir Rushaylo with Boris Gryzlov as Interior Minister, and Yevgeny Adamov with Alexander Rumyantsev as Minister for Atomic Energy.

On June 16, 2001, Boris Yatskevich was replaced with Vitaly Artyukhov as Minister of Natural Resources. Igor Yusufov was appointed Minister of Energy.

On October 16, 2001 Ministry for Federal, Ethnic and Migration Policy was abolished and the position of Minister of Industry, Science and Technologies was promoted to the rank of a Deputy Prime Minister. Accordingly, on October 17 Alexander Blokhin and Alexander Dondukov were dismissed, Ilya Klebanov was appointed Deputy Prime Minister and Minister of Industry, Science and Technologies. The position of Minister of the Russian Federation was established to coordinate ethnic policy, and on December 6 Vladimir Zorin assumed this position.

On January 3, 2002, Nikolay Aksyonenko was sacked as Minister of Railways and on January 4 was replaced with Gennady Fadeyev.

On February 18, Ilya Klebanov lost his position of a Deputy Prime Minister, but remained the Minister of Industry, Science and Technologies.

On November 6, Vladimir Yelagin was replaced with Stanislav Ilyasov as Minister for Coordination of the Development of the Chechen Republic.

On March 11, 2003, Valentina Matviyenko was dismissed from her position of a Deputy Prime Minister for Welfare as she became the Presidential Plenipotentiary Envoy to the Northwestern Federal District.

On April 24 Boris Alyoshin was appointed Deputy Prime Minister for Industry and Galina Karelova Deputy Prime Minister for Welfare.

On May 28 Igor Shuvalov was replaced with Konstantin Merzlikin as Minister, Chief of Staff of the Government.

On June 16, a position of Deputy Prime Minister for Housing was established and assumed by Vladimir Yakovlev, who had just resigned as Governor of Saint Petersburg.

On September 22, Minister of Railways Gennady Fadeyev resigned and became President of JSC Russian Railways. On October 9 Vadim Morozov became Minister of Railways.

On November 1, Ilya Klebanov resigned as Minister of Industry, Science and Technologies and was appointed Presidential Plenipotentiary Envoy to the Northwestern Federal District, replacing Valentina Matviyenko, who had been elected Governor of Saint Petersburg.

On November 6, his First Deputy Andrey Fursenko was appointed acting Minister of Industry, Science and Technologies.

On December 29, Boris Gryzlov, who had been elected to the State Duma, was dismissed as Interior Minister and replaced with Rashid Nurgaliyev as acting Minister.

Mikhail Kasyanov was sacked from his position by President Vladimir Putin on February 24, 2004, and was replaced with his Deputy Viktor Khristenko as acting Prime Minister. Other ministers remained acting until Mikhail Fradkov's First Cabinet was formed.

Ministers

|}

Notes

References

External links
Kasyanov's Cabinet, Politika.su (in Russian).

Kasyanov
2000 establishments in Russia
2004 disestablishments in Russia
Cabinets established in 2000
Cabinets disestablished in 2004